Satisfaction may refer to:
 Contentment
 Computer user satisfaction
 Customer satisfaction
 Job satisfaction
 Satisfaction theory of atonement, a Christian view of salvation
 The regaining of honour in a duel
 The process or outcome of assigning values to the free variables of a satisfiable formula

Law
 Satisfaction of legacies, a doctrine of fulfilling a legacy during the testator's lifetime.
 Accord and satisfaction, a contract law concept about the purchase of the release from a debt obligation

Entertainment and music
 Satisfaction (Australian TV series), a drama series which aired on Showcase Australia in 2007–2010
 Satisfaction (2013 TV series), a sitcom which aired on CTV
 Satisfaction (2014 TV series), a drama series on USA Network
 Satisfaction (1988 film), an American comedy-drama film
 Satisfaction (2010 film), a Russian drama film
 Satisfaction!, a 1965 album by jazz organist Don Patterson or its title track without the exclamation point
 "(I Can't Get No) Satisfaction", a 1965 rock song by The Rolling Stones
 "Satisfaction" (Laura Branigan song), a 1984 song by Laura Branigan
 "Satisfaction", a 1989 song by Wendy * Lisa from the album Fruit at the Bottom
 "Satisfaction", a 1991 song by Vanilla Ice from the album Extremely Live
 "Satisfaction", a 2018 song by Zayn from Icarus Falls
 "Satisfaction" (Eve song), a 2003 hip hop song
 "Satisfaction" (F.T. Island song), a 2011 pop rock song
 "Satisfaction" (Benny Benassi song)
 Thee Satisfaction, Hip-hop duo from Seattle

See also
 Satisfiability, a property pertaining to mathematical formulas
 Satisfy (disambiguation)